Sundarrao Abasaheb Solanke (1927-2014) was an Indian politician who served as Deputy Chief Minister of Maharashtra state.

Developmental work 
The construction of Beed-Parali road, Parali Thermal Power plant, Majalgaon dam, Majalgaon hydroelectric project, Kundalika project were started and completed during his time by his efforts.

See also 
Prakashdada Solanke

Baburao Narsingrao Kokate (Adaskar)

 Vilasrao Deshmukh

References 

Deputy Chief Ministers of Maharashtra
People from Beed district
20th-century Indian politicians
1927 births
2014 deaths
Indian National Congress politicians from Maharashtra
Indian Congress (Socialist) politicians